James Robert Oliver (born 3 December 1941) is a Scottish former professional footballer who played as a forward.

Career
Born in Falkirk, Scotland, Oliver played for Linlithgow Rose and Falkirk in the Scottish leagues before moving to English football with Norwich City, Brighton & Hove Albion and Colchester United.

Honours
Brighton & Hove Albion
 Football League Fourth Division: 1964–65

References

External links
 
 Jim Oliver at Colchester United Archive Database

1941 births
Living people
Footballers from Falkirk
Scottish footballers
Association football forwards
Linlithgow Rose F.C. players
Falkirk F.C. players
Norwich City F.C. players
Brighton & Hove Albion F.C. players
Colchester United F.C. players
King's Lynn F.C. players
Scottish Football League players
English Football League players